TAE Technologies, formerly Tri Alpha Energy, is an American company based in Foothill Ranch, California developing aneutronic fusion power. The company's design relies on an advanced beam-driven field-reversed configuration (FRC), which combines features from accelerator physics and other fusion concepts in a unique fashion, and is optimized for hydrogen-boron fuel, also known as proton-boron and p-B11. It regularly publishes theoretical and experimental results in academic journals with hundreds of publications and posters at scientific conferences and in a research library hosting these articles on its website. TAE has developed five generations of original fusion platforms with a sixth currently in development. It aims to manufacture a prototype commercial fusion reactor by 2030.

Organization
The company was founded in 1998, and is backed by private capital. TAE Technologies operated as a stealth company for many years, refraining from launching its website until 2015. The company did not generally discuss progress nor any schedule for commercial production. However, it has registered and renewed various patents. 

As of 2021, TAE Technologies reportedly had more than 250 employees and had raised over $880 million.

Funding 
Main financing has come from Goldman Sachs and venture capitalists such as Microsoft co-founder Paul Allen's Vulcan Inc., Rockefeller's Venrock, and Richard Kramlich's New Enterprise Associates. The Government of Russia, through the joint-stock company Rusnano, invested in Tri Alpha Energy in October 2012, and Anatoly Chubais, Rusnano CEO, became a board member. Other investors include the Wellcome Trust and the Kuwait Investment Authority. As of July 2017 the company reported that it had raised more than $500 million in backing. As of 2020, the company had raised over $600 million, which rose to around $880 million in 2021 and  $1.2 billion as of 2022.

Leadership and Board of Directors 
TAE's technology was co-founded by physicist Norman Rostoker, as a spin-out of his work at the University of California, Irvine. Steven Specker, the former CEO of the Electrical Power Research Institute (EPRI), served as CEO from October 2016 to July 2018. Michl Binderbauer, who earned his PhD. in plasma physics under the guidance of Rostoker at UCI, moved from CTO to CEO following Specker's retirement. Specker remains an advisor. Additional board members include Jeff Immelt, the former CEO of General Electric, John J. Mack, the former CEO of Morgan Stanley, and Ernest Moniz, the former United States Secretary of Energy at the US Department of Energy, who joined the company's board of directors in May 2017.

Collaborators 
Since 2014 TAE Technologies has worked with Google to develop a process to analyze the data collected on plasma behavior in fusion reactors. In 2017, using a machine learning tool developed through the partnership and based on the "Optometrist Algorithm", TAE was able to find significant improvements in plasma containment and stability over the previous C-2U machine. The results of the study were published in Scientific Reports. 

In November 2017 the company was admitted to a United States Department of Energy Innovative and Novel Computational Impact on Theory and Experiment program that allowed the company access to the Cray XC40 supercomputer. 

In 2021, TAE Technologies announced a joint research project with Japan’s Institute for Fusion Science (NIFS) to engage in a three year-long study on the effects of hydrogen-boron fuel reactions in the NIFS Large Helical Device (LHD).

Subsidiaries

TAE Life Sciences 
In March 2018 TAE Technologies announced that it had raised $40 million to spin off a subsidiary focused on refining boron neutron capture therapy (BNCT) for cancer treatment. The subsidiary is named TAE Life Sciences and it received funding led by ARTIS Ventures. TAE Life Sciences also announced that it would partner with Neuboron Medtech, which will be the first to install the company's beam system. The company shares common board members with TAE Technologies and is led by Bruce Bauer.

TAE Power Solutions 
In September 2021, TAE Technologies announced the formation of a new division, Power Solutions, to commercialize the power management systems developed on the C-2W/Norman reactor for the electric vehicle, charging infrastructure, and energy storage markets. The company also announced the appointment of veteran industrialist David Roberts as CEO of the new division.

Design

Underlying theory

In mainline fusion approaches, the energy needed to allow reactions, the Coulomb barrier, is provided by heating the fusion fuel to millions of degrees. In such fuel, the electrons disassociate from their ions, to form a gas-like mixture known as a plasma. In any gas-like mixture, the particles will be found in a wide variety of energies, according to the Maxwell–Boltzmann distribution. In these systems, fusion occurs when two of the higher-energy particles in the mix randomly collide. Keeping the fuel together long enough for this to occur is a major challenge.

TAE's machines spin plasma up into a looped structure called a field-reversed configuration (FRC) which is a loop of hot, dense plasma.  Material inside an FRC is self-contained by the fields that the plasma creates.  As the plasma current moves around the loop, it creates a magnetic field that is perpendicular to the direction of motion; much like current in a wire would do.  This self-created field helps to hold in the plasma current and keeps the loop stable.  

The challenge with field-reversed configurations is that they slow down over time, wobble and eventually collapse. The company's innovation was to continuously apply particle beams along the surface of the FRC to keep it rotating.  This beam and hoop system was key to increasing the longevity, stability and performance of these machines.

TAE's design

The TAE design forms a field-reversed configuration (FRC), a self-stabilized rotating toroid of particles similar to a smoke ring. In the TAE system, the ring is made as thin as possible, about the same aspect ratio as an opened tin can. Particle accelerators inject fuel ions tangentially to the surface of the cylinder, where they either react or are captured into the ring as additional fuel.

Unlike other magnetic confinement fusion devices such as the tokamak, FRCs provide a magnetic field topology whereby the axial field inside the reactor is reversed by eddy currents in the plasma, as compared to the ambient magnetic field externally applied by solenoids. The FRC is less prone to magnetohydrodynamic and plasma instabilities than are other magnetic confinement fusion methods. The science behind the colliding beam fusion reactor is used in the company's C-2, C-2U and C-2W projects.

A key concept in the TAE system is that the FRC is kept in a useful state over an extended period. To do this, the accelerators inject the fuel such that when the particles scatter within the ring they cause the fuel already there to speed up in rotation. This process would normally slowly increase the positive charge of the fuel mass, so electrons are also injected to keep the charge roughly neutralized.

The FRC is held in a cylindrical, truck-sized vacuum chamber containing solenoids. It appears the FRC will then be compressed, either using adiabatic compression similar to those proposed for magnetic mirror systems in the 1950s, or by forcing two such FRCs together using a similar arrangement.

The design must achieve the "hot enough/long enough" (HELE) threshold to achieve fusion. The required temperature is 3 billion degrees Celsius (~250 keV), while the required duration (achieved with C2-U) is multiple milliseconds.

The 11B(p,α)αα aneutronic reaction

An essential component of the design is the use of "advanced fuels", i.e. fuels with primary reactions that do not produce neutrons, such as hydrogen and boron-11. FRC fusion products are all charged particles for which highly efficient direct energy conversion is feasible. Neutron flux and associated on-site radioactivity is virtually non-existent. So unlike other nuclear fusion research involving deuterium and tritium, and unlike nuclear fission, no radioactive waste is created. The hydrogen and boron-11 fuel used in this type of reaction is also much more abundant.

TAE Technologies relies on the clean 11B(p,α)αα reaction, also written 11B(p,3α), which produces three helium nuclei called α−particles (hence the name of the company) as follows:

A proton (identical to the most common hydrogen nucleus) striking boron-11 creates a resonance in carbon-12, which decays by emitting one high-energy primary α−particle. This leads to the first excited state of beryllium-8, which decays into two low-energy secondary α-particles. This is the model commonly accepted in the scientific community since the published results account for a 1987 experiment.

TAE claimed that the reaction products should release more energy than what is commonly envisaged. In 2010, Henry R. Weller and his team from the Triangle Universities Nuclear Laboratory (TUNL) used the high intensity γ-ray source (HIγS) at Duke University, funded by TAE and the U.S. Department of Energy, to show that the mechanism first proposed by Ernest Rutherford and Mark Oliphant in 1933, then Philip Dee and C. W. Gilbert from the Cavendish Laboratory in 1936, and the results of an experiment conducted by French researchers from IN2P3 in 1969, was correct. The model and the experiment predicted two high energy α-particles of almost equal energy. One was the primary α-particle and the other a secondary α-particle, both emitted at an angle of 155 degrees. A third secondary α-particle is also emitted, of lower energy.

Inverse cyclotron converter (ICC)

Direct energy conversion systems for other fusion power generators, involving collector plates and "Venetian blinds" or a long linear microwave cavity filled with a 10-Tesla magnetic field and rectennas, are not suitable for fusion with ion energies above 1 MeV. The company employed a much shorter device, an inverse cyclotron converter (ICC) that operated at 5 MHz and required a magnetic field of only 0.6 tesla. The linear motion of fusion product ions is converted to circular motion by a magnetic cusp. Energy is collected from the charged particles as they spiral past quadrupole electrodes. More classical collectors collect particles with energy less than 1 MeV.

The estimation of the ratio of fusion power to radiation loss for a 100 MW FRC has been calculated for different fuels, assuming a converter efficiency of 90% for α-particles, 40% for Bremsstrahlung radiation through photoelectric effect, and 70% for the accelerators, with 10T superconducting magnetic coils:
 Q = 35 for deuterium and tritium
 Q = 3 for deuterium and helium-3
 Q = 2.7 for hydrogen and boron-11
 Q = 4.3 for polarized hydrogen and boron-11.
The spin polarization enhances the fusion cross section by a factor of 1.6 for 11B. A further increase in Q should result from the nuclear quadrupole moment of 11B. And another increase in Q may also result from the mechanism allowing the production of a secondary high-energy α-particle.

TAE Technologies plans to use the p-11B reaction in their commercial FRC for safety reasons and because the energy conversion systems are simpler and smaller: since no neutron is released, thermal conversion is unnecessary, hence no heat exchanger or steam turbine.

The "truck-sized" 100 MW reactors designed in TAE presentations are based on these calculations.

Progression of Machines

Sewer Pipe 
Developed in 1998, the company’s proof-of-concept machine was created using a common sewer pipe and first demonstrated the viability of forming a field-reverse configured magnetic field.

CBFR-SPS
The CBFR-SPS is a 100 MW-class, magnetic field-reversed configuration, aneutronic fusion rocket concept. The reactor is fueled by an energetic-ion mixture of hydrogen and boron (p-11B). Fusion products are helium ions (α-particles) expelled axially out of the system. α-particles flowing in one direction are decelerated and their energy directly converted to power the system; and particles expelled in the opposite direction provide thrust. Since the fusion products are charged particles and does not release neutrons, the system does not require the use of a massive radiation shield.

C-2
Various experiments have been conducted by TAE Technologies on the world's largest compact toroid device called "C-2". Results began to be regularly published in 2010, with papers including 60 authors. C-2 results showed peak ion temperatures of 400 Electron volts (5 million degrees Celsius), electron temperatures of 150 Electron volts, plasma densities of 1E19 m−3 and 1E9 fusion neutrons per second for 3 milliseconds.

Budker Institute

The Budker Institute of Nuclear Physics, Novosibirsk, built a powerful plasma injector, shipped in late 2013 to the company's research facility. The device produces a neutral beam in the range of 5 to 20 MW, and injects energy inside the reactor to transfer it to the fusion plasma.

C-2U
In March 2015, the upgraded C-2U with edge-biasing beams showed a 10-fold improvement in lifetime, with FRCs heated to 10 million degrees Celsius and lasting 5 milliseconds with no sign of decay. The C-2U functions by firing two donut shaped plasmas at each other at 1 million kilometers per hour, the result is a cigar-shaped FRC  as much as 3 meters long and 40 centimeters across. The plasma was controlled with magnetic fields generated by electrodes and magnets at each end of the tube. The upgraded particle beam system provided 10 megawatts of power.

C-2W/Norman 
In 2017, TAE Technologies renamed the C-2W reactor "Norman" in honor of the company's co-founder Norman Rostoker who died in 2014. In July 2017, the company announced that the Norman reactor had achieved plasma. The Norman reactor is reportedly able to operate at temperatures between 50 million and 70 million°C. In February 2018, the company announced that after 4,000 experiments it had reached a high temperature of nearly 20 million°C. In 2018, TAE Technologies partnered with the Applied Science team at Google to develop the technology inside Norman to maximize electron temperature, aiming to demonstrate breakeven fusion. In 2021, TAE Technologies stated Norman was regularly producing a stable plasma at temperatures over 50 million degrees, meeting a key milestone for the machine and unlocking an additional $280 million in financing, bringing its total of funding raised up to $880 million. In 2023, the company published a peer-reviewed paper reporting the first measurement of p-B11 fusion in magnetically confined plasma.

Copernicus 
The Copernicus device will operate using hydrogen and is expected to attain net energy gain around 2025. The approximate cost of the reactor is $200 million, and it is intended to reach temperatures of around 100 million°C to validate conditions needed for deuterium-tritium fusion while the company scales to p-11B fuel for its superior environmental and cost profile. TAE intends to start construction in 2022.

Da Vinci 
The Da Vinci device is a proposed successor device to Copernicus. It is a prototype for a commercially scalable reactor. It is scheduled to be developed in the second half of the 2020s and is expected to achieve 3 billion°C and produce fusion energy from the p-11B fuel cycle.

See also

 China Fusion Engineering Test Reactor
 Commonwealth Fusion Systems
 Dense plasma focus
 Fusion Industry Association
 General Fusion
 Polywell
 Spherical Tokamak for Energy Production

References

External links 
 

Accelerator physics
Plasma physics
Nuclear physics
Nuclear fusion
Fusion power
Nuclear power companies of the United States
Nuclear technology companies of the United States